Light Up the Night is the debut studio album by Canadian country music artist Jess Moskaluke. It was released on April 15, 2014 via MDM Recordings. The album was preceded by the singles "Good Lovin'" and "Cheap Wine and Cigarettes". Moskaluke released a line of lip gloss the same week as the album.

Track listing

Chart performance

Singles

References

External links

2014 debut albums
Jess Moskaluke albums
MDM Recordings albums